Veera Uppapong (born 24 December 1940) is a Thai sports shooter. He competed in the men's 50 metre free pistol event at the 1976 Summer Olympics.

References

1940 births
Living people
Veera Uppapong
Veera Uppapong
Shooters at the 1976 Summer Olympics
Place of birth missing (living people)
Asian Games medalists in shooting
Shooters at the 1974 Asian Games
Shooters at the 1978 Asian Games
Veera Uppapong
Veera Uppapong
Medalists at the 1974 Asian Games
Medalists at the 1978 Asian Games
Veera Uppapong